Kent Thompson (born November 1, 1963) is an American politician. He has served as a Republican member for the 9th district in the Kansas House of Representatives since 2013.

He is a former Majority Whip of the Kansas House of Representatives, holding the post from 2017 to 2019. For the 2019–2020 session he serves as the chairman of the House Local Government Committee and as a member of the House Transportation Committee and the House Agriculture Committee.

References

1963 births
Living people
Republican Party members of the Kansas House of Representatives
21st-century American politicians